Emil Petru (28 September 1939 – 1 March 1995) was a Romanian professional footballer who plays as a midfielder.

In his career, he played mainly for Universitatea Cluj and represented Romania at the 1964 Summer Olympics.

Honours
Știința Cluj
Divizia B: 1957–58
Dinamo București
Divizia A: 1963–64, 1964–65
Cupa României: 1963–64
CFR Cluj
Divizia B: 1968–69

Notes

References

External links
 

1939 births
1995 deaths
People from Târnăveni
Romanian footballers
Romania international footballers
Association football midfielders
Liga I players
FC Universitatea Cluj players
FC Dinamo București players
Liga II players
CFR Cluj players
Olympic footballers of Romania
Footballers at the 1964 Summer Olympics